Gleydimar Tapia Romero (born 27 February 1992) is a Venezuelan former road and track cyclist.
She competed at the 2015 Pan American Games.

Major results

2012
 National Track Championships
1st  Sprint
1st  Keirin
1st  500m time trial
2013
 National Track Championships
1st  Sprint
1st  Keirin
1st  500m time trial
 1st Sprint, Copa Cobernador de Carabobo
 Pan American Track Championships
3rd  Sprint
3rd  Team sprint
2014
 2nd Clasico FVCiclismo Corre Por la VIDA
 7th Copa Federación Venezolana de Ciclismo
2015
 1st Copa Federación Venezolana de Ciclismo
 1st Team pursuit, Copa Cuba de Pista (with Jennifer Cesar, Leidimar Suárez & Zuralmy Rivas)
 1st Mountains classification Vuelta Internacional Femenina a Costa Rica
 Copa Venezuela
2nd Omnium
3rd 500m time trial
 3rd Road race, National Road Championships
 4th Clasico FVCiclismo Corre Por la VIDA
 6th Road race, Pan American Road Championships
 10th Road race, Pan American Games

References

External links

1992 births
Living people
Venezuelan female cyclists
Cyclists at the 2015 Pan American Games
Pan American Games competitors for Venezuela
21st-century Venezuelan women